Ebrahimabad-e Deh Gavi (also Romanized as Ebrāhīmābād-e Deh Gāvī; also known as Ebrāhīmābād) is a village in Chahdegal Rural District, Negin Kavir District, Fahraj County, Kerman Province, Iran. At the 2006 census, its population was 151, in 39 families.

References 

Populated places in Fahraj County